Monda, is a traditional Bangladeshi sweet originated in Muktagachha, Bangladesh. The sweet, first made in 1824 by Gopal Pal, is reputed in Bangladesh and many countries for its originality, taste and flavour.

History

Ram Gopal Pal, better known as Gopal Pal, first prepared this sweetmeat in 1824. He offered it to Maharaja Suryakanta Acharya Chowdhury, one of the leading zamindars of Muktagacha.
Maharaja Suryakanta was full of praise for Gopal Pal and encouraged him to prepare monda to entertain guests who visited the zamindars. The zamindars also extended financial support to Gopal Pal for the expansion of the business.

Now Sree Ramendranath Pal and Brothers run the business. They are the fifth generation of the Gopal Pal family.

See also
 List of Bangladeshi sweets and desserts

References

Bengali cuisine
Bangladeshi cuisine